The Argentine football league system include tournaments organised by the Argentine Football Association. Clubs affiliated to the body compete in the tournaments, which are split into categories or divisions.

Rules establish a system of promotion and relegation, a process where teams are transferred between two divisions based on their performance for the completed season. The best-ranked team or teams in the lower division are promoted to the higher division for the next season, and the worst-ranked team or teams in the higher division are relegated to the lower division for the next season.

Current league system (2023) 
Below the second division championship (Primera Nacional), tournaments leagues are split between two groups, the first of them include the promotion/relegation system for clubs directly affiliated to AFA playing in Primera B, Primera C and Primera D. Those are usually called "zona metropolitana" (metropolitan zone) due to those tournaments have been historically played by teams from the city of Buenos Aires and Greater Buenos Aires, plus the addition of twenty one clubs from the cities of Rosario, Santa Fe, La Plata, Zarate, Campana, Luján, Junín, General Rodríguez, Cañuelas, Pilar and Mercedes.

The second group is formed for clubs indirectly affiliated to AFA that play in regional leagues, under the supervision of Consejo Federal (es), dependent on the AFA. Competitions reserved for those clubs are Torneo Federal A and Torneo Regional Federal.

History 
Tournaments organised by the Association and its predecessors have been held since 1893 (the year when the current AFA was established). Nevertheless, the first championship was organised by the Argentine Association Football League (the first organised body in the country) in 1891. Although the AAFL was dissolved that same year, AFA has recognised that championship as the first Primera División competition, adding it to its continuity.

Until the creation of Campeonato Nacional in 1967, only clubs directly affiliated to AFA had taken part in tournaments organised by the body. From 1986, with the creation of Campeonato Nacional B, teams from regional leagues (clubs indirectly affiliated to AFA) added to the regular competition.

Historic tables 
The following charts detail all league competitions organised by the Argentine Association (National cups are not included):

Year by year 
Defunct tournaments indicated in

By tournament 
Defunct competitions indicated in

References

External links
 AFA official site  
 Sólo Ascenso 
 Ascenso del Interior (regional)
 Interior Futbolero 
 Promiedos (results)

 
Argentina